Milman is a rural locality in the Livingstone Shire, Queensland, Australia. In the  Milman had a population of 113 people.

Geography 
Alligator Creek, a tributary of the Fitzroy River, forms the western boundary of the locality. The Bruce Highway and North Coast railway line pass through the south-west corner of the locality, which was served by the Milman railway station which opened in 1913 but has since been abandoned.

The land use is farming, predominantly cattle grazing.

History 

The locality is named after its railway station, which was named Milman on 20 October 1918 having previously been known as Jardine. It is thought that the Milman name refers to public servant Hugh Miles Milman who married Katherine Maule Jardine in 1871.

Jardine Provisional School opened on 11 August 1913, becoming Jardine State School on 1 December 1914. It was renamed Milman State School about 1934.

In the  Milman had a population of 113 people.

Settlement by the German immigrants 
Milman was established as a settlement by German immigrants, known as "The Alligator Creek Group" in 1910. The district was known as Jardine because this was name given to the Parish of land. (This discussion deals only with the German settlers who arrived in 1910 and not with the portions 1 to 20 of the Jardine Parish located along The Caves–Rossmoya Road, and the main road heading north, that were accessible and many had been settled prior to 1910.) The parish had not been surveyed beyond those accessible blocks and was virgin bushland when the German Immigrants came in 1910.

The migration of Germans came out of the initiative of Queensland Premier William Kidson of Queensland (19 January 1906 to 19 November 1907 and 18 February 1908 to 7 February 1911) who established a program to bring immigrants to Queensland to open the rural land. Kidson established a program calling for immigrants including Nominated Immigrants who were sponsored by residents of Queensland and the Queensland Government provided passage assistance. For example, a family had to pay £4 instead of £12/10/- for a ship passage from London. A Reverend Michael Bernoth  of the Seven Day Adventist Church and resided in Gatton Queensland established a relationship and understanding with the State Government to bring a large of Queensland of Immigrants (just under 100) to Jardine. (Bernoth also undertook the migration of another group of Germans to Ambrose Siding on the Gladstone-Rockhampton Railway, between Raglan and Mount Larcombe, also in 1910 - after the Jardine/Alligator Creek Group. A Pastor Niemeyer undertook the immigration of Germans commencing about 1909 under a similar arrangement with the State Government but to the Bundaberg area. Immigration was undertaken by a State government; following Federation (of Australia) in 1901; immigration responsibility had not yet transferred to the Federal Government by 1910.)

There was much adversity for the immigrants to get to Australia. The immigrants for Jardine came principally from the impoverished working class residents of eastern Berlin. With the diplomatic conflict between Germany and England tensions high in the mid-1910s, owing to Germany's military expansionism, and the German Kaiser had forbidden any immigrants leaving Germany to other than German colonies. This meant immigrants had to first get to a foreign port to immigrate. The Jardine immigrants had to secretly leave Berlin and travel to London, through Amsterdam Holland, to board a ship for Queensland with the assistance of The Queensland Agent General. All communication prior to departure from Berlin was necessary by word of mouth to select the immigrants and secretly. No one could tell anyone they were leaving otherwise the police would have jailed the intending immigrants; school children could not tell their friends they would not be at school the next day.

Economic factors in Germany were a motivation for immigration. Germany has been a booming industrial power from the formation of Germany in 1871 up to 1900. From the beginning of 1908 something of a revival occurred to the German migration to Queensland, with a total of 778 settlers landing in Brisbane between February 1908 and the middle of 1910. This phenomenon was not unconnected with the downturn of the business cycle in Germany that commenced in 1907. While Niemeyer's emigrants were poor, they were positively well-off in comparison to most of those brought out by Bernoth. The latter included, according to Berlin police, persons who had been on poor relief; number of the Jardine immigrants would have been unemployed.

The first ship load of immigrants (brought to Australia from London aboard the S.S. Omrah) arrived on the banks of Alligator Creek on 11 January 1910. The second ship load of immigrants departed London on Friday 28 January 1910 and arrived on the banks of the Alligator Creek in late April 1910 having berthed in Brisbane aboard the S.S. Oswestry Grange on 23 March 1910. These immigrants had travelled by train from Berlin to Amsterdam to get to London undetected by the German authorities. The first ship's immigrants were affected by dengue fever upon arrival in Brisbane. When the second ship arrived the immigrants complained to the Imperial German Consul about the poor and contaminated food, and the poor hygiene of catering staff, on the vessel – this resulted in a Government inquiry and the complaint was upheld. Both ships were freighters rather than passenger ships and the immigrants were accommodated under canvas on-deck. Some German's, believed to be those who abandoned Alligator Creek in January, met the second ship and emphasised to their countrymen the unsatisfactory conditions. Five men travelled to Alligator Creek to assess the conditions and report to the immigrants. A number of families did not proceed as planned to settle in Jardine.

While in most other districts land would be surveyed and buyers would purchase surveyed blocks, the land in Jardine had not been surveyed before immigrants arrived  and therefore the portions were unknown. On 18 November 1909 Mr. Staff Surveyor Ellis was instructed to ‘at once design the area’ - about 22,000 acres for Agricultural Farm selection; the scrub land into 160 acres; superior forest into 320 acres, and inferior forest into 640 to 1280 acre blocks. On 29 November 1909 Mr Ellis was additionally requested to make out one or more of the principal roads so that the Germans may be employed in clearing and forming the roads immediately on their arrival; permanent survey of the farms would follow. As early as mid November 1909 there was agreement by the Government, in response to Rev. M. Bernoth's request, that the immigrant men be employed clearing roads and ‘otherwise improving the area reserved for them’ but the Government directed that the cost of such improvement is added to the price of the land. If this had not been done the immigrants would have needed to find paid employment elsewhere. Mr. Ellis commenced the survey work on 29 November.

Inspector Turner of the Department of Works oversaw the settling-in of the immigrants and the road building works; his tenure was almost 12 months. He worked closely with the Lands Department, the surveyor and the Government in Brisbane. He was highly critical of the immigrant's manual skills both initially and even in his final report. These men were not skilled in using hand tools for the purposes of road building and had to be taught those skills; their professions were (in decreasing order of numbers) Labourers, Locksmiths, Blacksmiths, Cabinet Makers, Stonemasons, Carpenters, Painters, Engineers, Joiners, Dairyman, Tailor, Gardener, Butcher, Tinsmith, Furniture Polisher, Iron Worker, Spinner, Cigar Maker, Mechanic, Gunsmith and Miner.

Inspector Turner can be credited with an enormous effort on his part to help them establish and even helping them during periods of extremely heavy rain and flooding of Alligator Creek (at one time swimming two flooded creeks to report their safety and arrange safety checking by the Yaamba Police ). The first ship load of immigrants arrived amid torrential rain on 11 January 1910 and already local flooding of streams feeding the Alligator Creek required that the settlers had to be taken by dray an additional distance of about 1½ Miles through the bush (expected to be along ridge lines to avoid flooded creeks). It was so boggy (‘4½ miles of sludge’) on the dirt tracks that the Inspector had to abandon the transfer from the landing point (forde – probably what is now Plentiful Creek Rd) on the Alligator Creek to the German Camp No 1 on the first day. The rain was so persistent that the balance of their goods, were not be delivered to their camp until 22 January.

On 18 January 1910 he reported finding ‘their camp in such an insanitary condition’. The immigrants had no bush skills, and the excessive rain would have inundated the site even though it was on a rise. He spent the day helping to reorganise the camp rather than starting work on the roads. This camp, which Turner had personally selected, was located on what was to become Portion 52 when the parish of Jardine was surveyed; close to the boundary of Portion 51 and less than 200 meters from Alligator Creek. The settlers on the S.S. Oswestry arrived mid-late April and were located closer to the railway station (opened 1913), on the left of Milman Road and also bounded by Canal Creek Rd (later to become Alligator Creek Rd – never to become trafficable, because of the deep ‘Black Gully’, which the authorities never made into a road. The site of the second camp was known on the maps variably as ‘Reserve’, Water Reserve (W.R.) and later was established as Portion 101 when no longer needed as public land.

Camp 1 was an area 184’ [60 metres] by 99’ [32 metres] with a "bough shed 40’ (12m) by 13’ (4m) [presumably a common gathering place] in the middle, and eight fireplaces behind two rows of tents on each long side; a total of 30 tents for 25 families . These settlers had come from the poor areas of eastern Berlin (principally but not entirely) to canvas tents in the middle of heavy summer rains in virgin scrub. The conditions must have been unbearable as the rain was torrential; six families abandoned the camp by 20 January and a scathing letter was published in the Truth newspaper Brisbane about the conditions.

The first survey map was not published until about 11 April 1910; only then could the immigrants consider what blocks they may wish to acquire but the second ship immigrants had not yet arrived.  By the time the immigrants on board the Oswestry Grange arrived at Alligator Creek the roads were almost complete so the Government extended the paid employment of men to fell 10 acres of land on 30 portions in the initial survey of 42 portions. This survey only included Jardine proper and did not include North Jardine – it comprised portions 23 to 64. By unknown negotiations Portions 70 and 71 were added and these portions had 10 acres cleared as well; part of the 30. The unusual circumstances resulted in the settlers being allowed to occupy their land before they had signed a Lease with the Government. The settlers had to compete: an ‘Application by Alien For Certificate’, an ‘Application to Select an Agricultural Farm’ and they needed obtain a ‘Certificate that Alien is able to Read and Write from Dictation’ before being granted a ‘Licence to Occupy an Agricultural Farm’ and then sign the Lease.

The Parish was initially reserved for those known as "The Alligator Creek Group" and when the Government advertised the land for sale it was publicly listed for purchase exclusively by that group. There is no documentation to substantiate this but there are suggestions that the first group of immigrants believed they should have been given priority for the selection of the land because they had been working hard for almost four months building the roads before the second group arrived. There was in fact a ‘ballot’ conducted within The Alligator Creek Group, presumably overseen by Reverend Bernoth, who must have negotiated an equitable outcome; held sometime after the second boat load of settlers arrived but before August. The ballot was in fact only for the 160 acre lots because the one 512 acre lot (Portion 45), five surveyed 320 acre blocks (Portions 42, 43, 44, 46 and 47), and two unsurveyed blocks (Portions 71 and 72  - also 320 acres) were ‘agreed’ (as to who would get them), under some controversy, before the ballot. Also, there must have been an agreement with the Government that the outcome of this ballot within the Group would be accepted as applicants for the land once it came to be released by the Rockhampton Land Court. Most settlers moved from their Camps progressively and by mid September  only three families remained in camps . The first release of the land in the Land Court was not until 7 December 1911 in the Government Gazette.

The Gazette did not identify the full conditions of sale but it clearly stated they were for selection by "The Alligator Creek Group". There was no specific reference to them being German. There were strict conditions to be fulfilled:
 To occupy within six months and occupy continuously thereafter - for the first five years by personal residence and then by "continuous and bona-fide residence by yourself or your register bailiff"; Forfeiture would occur if the leasor failed to occupy as required (exemptions could be applied for so they could be employed off farm).
 To clear 10-acres within six months (this was overtaken by the fact the Government paid the immigrants wages to clear these 10 acres but this recovered through the Survey Fee)
 An annual payment equal to one-fortieth of the purchase price to be made annually by 31 March; a survey fee must be paid in equal annual installments for four years. Failure to pay may result in forfeiture but can be paid within 21 days with a 10 percent per centum penalty.
 Within five years the land must be enclosed with a "good and substantial fence" and permanent improvements undertaken equal to the value of such fence; the leasor was required to "apply to the Commissioner for a certificate." (a condition to cultivate an area was removed from the Notice of Approval they were given. Again, forfeiture was stated should they not comply.
 After five years and the required improvements had been affected they could apply for a Deed of Grant (freehold) provided they paid off the balance of the purchase price (40 years rent). They were required to apply for Deed of Grant within 12 months of the expiration of the lease or again forfeiture was stated.

The gap between the settlers moving to their blocks (late 1910) and the first release of land (7 Dec 1911), was caused by the need of the Government to determine how the settlers were going to be indebted for the additional costs the Government had incurred. The Government wanted to be repaid for the wages it had paid the settlers and also for a provision of Galvanised Iron roofing material/sheets that had been arranged by Inspector Turner and Reverend Bernoth (a Government controlled item at the time). The establishment of Jardine was rather unique. In the end the Government established a price for the Land and the settlers would be mortgagees to the government's Agricultural Bank but the settlers would pay rent to Government at a rate per acre per year. In addition, the Government introduced an additional fee upon the settlers that was titled a "Survey Fee" at a rate per year per portion of land, for four years, to recover the cost borne by the Government for the additional assistance they determined had been given the settlers.

To demonstrate what the settlers paid, Portion 44 is used as an example. Portion 44 was a 320-acre portion (exactly). This portion had a rent of 5 pence per acre per year (a total of £6/13/4 per year) and a purchase price of 16/8 per acre (£266/13/8). The Survey Fee  of  £2/5/10 per year, for four years, was added. This Survey Fee did not appear in the Government Gazette releasing the land for sale and therefore was a non-transparent cost.

The financial structure required the selector signing a lease with the Government to pay the Rent and Survey Fee and also a mortgage to the Agricultural Bank of Queensland. While the bank did not receive payments they had the power to foreclose if the selector fell behind in payments; this occurred, for example, to Friedrich Herrmann Richard Lamain (Portion 54) when the bank disposed of the property to James Stafford Heaslip on 18 September 1929. Mr. Heaslip then continued the payments until freehold title was granted on 3 January 1936.

The original settlers who set out from Germany, with all the unknowns and risks, who stuck it out through all the challenges that were placed before them and moved on to land, were: from the S. S. Omrah - Herman August Ebelt (Portion 71), Gustaf W. Ebelt (son)(40), Gustav Karl Priebst (55), Friedrich Herrmann Richard Lamain (54), Max Scheibe (51), Max Kossendey (36), Willy Bernhard Ernst Kossendey (39)(brothers), Ernst Lewandowsky (senior), Friedrich Ernst Lewandowsky (son)(settled together on Portion 35), Paul Lewandowsky(son)(37), Max Menzel (33) and Anton Nawrath (27); and from the S. S. Oswestry Grange; Otto Reinhold Paul Hanschen (72), Karl Friedrich Loose (45), George Lennig (42), Fredrich Wilhelm Curt  Henke (38), Otto Haase (28) and Heinrich Gottlieb Albert Detjen (44). All the men had families except Bernhard Kossendey and Otto Hanschen; unfortunately, Anton Nawrath fell ill and about August 1914 had to surrender his portion of land.

While some of the immigrants who came on the two ships abandoned the settlement before  the immigrants even obtained their blocks (5 families left within 9 days), some additional Germans joined The Alligator Creek Group; informal communication within the German community was strong and there was plenty of press – Mr. Bernoth kept a high profile in support of his activity. The last to be granted land as a member of the Alligator Creek Group in the Rockhampton Land Court on the 5 September 1914 was Gustaf Adolf Kerk. However, some of these did not seem to be Nominated Immigrants.

The Kerk family were Nominated Immigrants by Max Scheibe. Mr Scheibe's wife, Martha Scheibe, drowned in Alligator Creek on Friday 19 August 1910, while drawing water from the creek, leaving a child only one year old. Martha Scheibe was the first death in the settlement. The second recorded death was that of Max Kossendey on Monday 13 July 1914 shortly between 11am and noon at 28 or 29 years of age. His spring cart overturned and killed him instantaneously while he was transporting pumpkins to the Jardine (later Milman) Railway Station, through a steep gully just west of the school, on what is now Milman Rd. He left a widow (Elizabeth) and two children, one eight years of age and the other ten months old. His body was buried on their farm (Portion 36), on the bank of a small creek that became known as Kunze's Gully. Elizabeth Kossendey remained on the property and married Mr. Kunze.

The original settlers who set out from Germany specifically recruited for Jardine and travelled on the S.S. Omrah and the S.S. Oswestry Grange were: from the S. S. Omrah – Herman August Ebelt (Portion 71), Gustaf W. Ebelt (son)(40), Gustav Karl Priebst (55), Friedrich Herrmann Richard Lamain (54), Max Scheibe (51), Max Kossendey (36), Willy Bernhard Ernst Kossendey (39)(brothers), Ernst Lewandowsky (senior), Friedrich Ernst Lewandowsky (son)(settled together on Portion 35), Paul Lewandowsky(son)(37), C. Max Menzel (33) and Anton Nawrath (27); and from the S. S. Oswestry Grange; Otto Reinhold Paul Hanschen (72), Karl Friedrich Loose (45), George Lennig (42), Fredrich Wilhelm Curt  Henke (38), Otto Haase (28) and Heinrich Gottlieb Albert Detjen (44).

From the S.S. Omrah, 14 men obtained licences of which four were single (three having departed London as teenagers) from a total male count, including the three teenagers) of 30 (Bernhard Kossendey arrived single but had a partner by the time of the land ballot).

Of the 19 men on the Oswestry Grange, six obtained land licences of which only one (Otto Hanschen) was single.

For the combined two ships, of a total of 49 (men) over the age of 16 years at licence application time, 20 (<44%) obtained land licences; the single men were: Hanschen(about 26 years of age); Richard Lamain (about 25); E. F. Lewandowsky (about 20), P.K. Lewandowsky (18) and Willie Ebelt (16). Willie Ebelt was the youngest settler - at the required minimum age of 16 to obtain a licence for land.

On 6 January 1911 the Public Lands Department reported that of the 19 families occupying Jardine land during the recent settlement, eight families initially settled in huts, nine families commenced life on their selections in tents and for three families the type of accommodation was not recorded. On 16 of the 19 blocks visited the growing of maize was the commercial crop but in most of these cases the settlers have small vegetable gardens. Many men are away working to obtain off-farm income. Some of the men were worked at Thompsons Point [six kilometres from the mouth of the Fitzroy River on the north side], Mt Chalmers mine, Many Peaks [the Boyne Valley Railway south of Gladstone and west of the German Settlement of Baffle Creek]; Mt Morgan [working on the Dawson Valley Railway Line - D.V. Line] and the extension of the northern line from Rockhampton (1912 to 1914). Early reports also included the growing of potatoes and pumpkin (which could be used for human consumption as well as feeding pigs). A number of the early settlers also travelled north at cane harvesting time. The precise timing of all this employment is not known except the extension to Jardine that opened on the Saturday 28 June 1913.

The railway line to Jardine did not exist when the settlers arrived in 1910. The extension of the railway beyond Rockhampton towards Mackay was commenced in 1912 and some of the Jardine settlers were employed on the line construction. The construction beyond Jardine was delayed by the need to complete the railway bridge across the Alligator Creek – a large bridge. On Saturday 28 June 1913 the North Coast Railway to Jardine was opened  (There is much written that the opening was 1 July but this is incorrect. The opening was on a Saturday and 1 July was not a Saturday). 2000 people attended using three special trains from Rockhampton – the extension from Glenmore Junction was 21 miles and 4 chains. The line was opened beyond Jardine to Yaamba, a distance of 2 miles on 1 October 1913 after the construction of the Alligator Creek Railway Bridge. The opening of the Jardine railway station was a major step in the development of Jardine as it made it easy for the new settlers to get their produce to market. The railway station soon became a post office for delivery purpose initially and by February 1916 it had become a receiving post office. Approval for renaming of the railway station to Milman was reported in October 1916: whether this was as a result of the policy of removing German place names during World War 1 or that there already existed another station named Jardine Valley on the Great Northern Railway – which, in 1913, ran from Townsville to Duchess (later to Mt Isa); it was more likely the latter.

Establishment of the School 
An Application for the Establishment of a State School was submitted on 3 August 1912 after earlier submissions to the Department of Public Instruction had failed. A School Building Committee consisting of Anton Nawarth, Max Menzel, Otto Raders, Johann Gardey and Louis Meyer (Secretary) had been elected on 13 March 1912.

On 30 October 1912 the Under Secretary of the Department Public Instruction replied  to Mr. Meyer that until the district was more populated the educational needs of the children would be met by establishment of a tent school and the Railway Department had been requested to have a framed tent constructed; the Works Department would supply the necessary furniture, water tank and earth closets and the Department Public Instruction would find a teacher.
There was some controversy as to where the school would be built. While the reserve was adjacent Portion 35, where the school was eventually built, this did not suit many parents whose children were on the other side of Mt Yaamba. Mr. Ferdinand Arthur Bahlinger offered 5 acres on his property (Portion 26) which was much closer to the majority of potential students and there were bitter feelings in the community about where the school should be located. The Government tried in vain to get the community to agree on the location, and the last application nominated the existing Crown Land School Reserve, yet controversy persisted with letters to the Minister by dissatisfied parties until the Minister finally made the decision 

The settlers must have had discussions with Railways and tried to get a framed tent with floor 40’ long and 12’ wide, however this exceeded the budget and on referral to the Department Public Instruction a framed tent consisting of a walled building (tent) of only 10’ 6" x 12’ with a galvanised roof of 17’ 6" by 15’ 6" was installed. The walled building was a canvas tent with wooden sides 3’ 6" high and the remaining walls were rolled up canvas for windows. A gap existed between the inner tent and the galvanised roof for air flow and being larger than the tent provided shade.

The first teacher was Mr. Karl August Mohr who ceased work at the Gurrumba school, a mining district 100 km west of Innisfail, on 30 July and arrived at Jardine on 7 August about 3 o’clock. The second letter to the Department on 8 August 1913 advised he had taken charge of the Jardine Provisional School on that day. The parents provided the teachers hut, as a condition of obtaining approval for a school and this completed by the settlers at their cost in February 1913. This was a stand-alone single-room sawn-timber hut 12’ by 8’ with a 6’ verandah along a long side and a water tank.

The names of the first school committee, elected at a meeting on 24 August 1913 attended by 18 settlers, was: Chairman Mr. Otto Haase, Secretary Mr. Louis Meyer, Treasurer Mr. Kurt Henke, Members Messrs Max Menzel and Frank Maleszka."  The parents and settlers must have been devastated when Mr. Mohr did not return from Christmas holidays the next year, because of his untimely ill health, and he died the following year.

Education 
Milman State School is a government primary (Prep-6) school for boys and girls at 335 Milman Road. In 2016, the school had an enrolment of 7 students with 2 teachers and 3 non-teaching staff (1 full-time equivalent). In 2018, the school had an enrolment of 7 students with 2 teachers and 5 non-teaching staff (2 full-time equivalent).

There is no secondary school in Milman. The nearest secondary school is Glenmore State High School in Kawana, Rockhampton.

References

Further reading 
 
 

Shire of Livingstone
Localities in Queensland